Ausa is one of an Assembly Constituency in Latur.

After the delimitation exercise, the Ausa Assembly Constituency is made of some villages in Ausa taluk and some villages in Nilanga taluk. Remaining villages of Ausa taluka are attached to Latur Rural Assembly Constituey. Further the Ausa constituency is partially attached to Latur Lok Sabha and partially to Osmanabad Lok Sabha constituency.

In Ausa Assembly constituency traditionally Indian National Congress party is the strongest party.

Members of Assembly

Election results

Assembly elections 1972

Assembly elections 2014

References 

Results Maharashtra State Assembly Elections 2009
Ausa (Maharashtra) Assembly Constituency Election Update

Assembly constituencies of Latur district
Latur
Assembly constituencies of Maharashtra